Whichaway Nunataks is a group of rocky nunataks extending for 7 nautical miles (13 km) and marking the south side of the mouth of Recovery Glacier. First seen from the air and visited in 1957 by the Commonwealth Trans-Antarctic Expedition and so named because it was uncertain which route from the nunataks would lead furthest inland. The Blackwall Ice Stream  joins Recovery Glacier between the Argentina Range and the Whichaway Nunataks.

Nunataks of Coats Land